Alan Waldron may refer to:

Alan Waldron (cricketer) (1920–1999), English cricketer
Alan Waldron (footballer) (born 1951), English professional footballer